The J.M. Daniel House and the J.M. Daniel School-District No. 3 are historic sites in or near Hamlet, Nebraska which were separately listed on the National Register of Historic Places in 1985.

They were both built by J.M Daniel.

The house, built in 1876, has also been known as Estelle Post Office and Store;  the school, built in 1884, has also been known as Estelle School.

They are stone buildings.

See also
St. John's Evangelical Lutheran German Church and Cemetery, also listed on the National Register in Hayes County

References

External links

NE
National Register of Historic Places in Hayes County, Nebraska
Houses completed in 1876
Buildings and structures completed in 1884
Houses on the National Register of Historic Places in Nebraska
School buildings on the National Register of Historic Places in Nebraska